The Red Line is one of the two lines of Dublin's Luas light rail system. The Red Line runs in an east–west direction through the city centre, north of the River Liffey, before travelling southwest to Tallaght, with a fork to Citywest and Saggart. The Red Line opened on 26 September 2004.

History
Construction work began in March 2001 on the Tallaght to Connolly line, as well as the Sandyford to St. Stephen's Green section of the second line, with Ansaldo of Italy and MVM of Australia getting the contract to build the system. The St. Stephen's Green to Dublin Airport section was dropped before construction began, as it was decided to serve the area by a metro instead. The contract to maintain operate the system was awarded to Transdev Ireland (formerly known as Connex).

The extension from Connolly to The Point opened in 2009, with the extension from Belgard to Saggart opening in 2011.

Interchange with the Green Line began in December 2017 with its extension crossing the Red Line either side of the Abbey Street stop.

Rolling stock

The Luas Red Line is operated using Citadis trams.

Depot
The tram depot for the Red Line is located at Red Cow where the main control room for the entire Luas system is also located.

Route

See also
 Green Line
 Luas

References

External links 
 Red Line stops on Luas website

Luas
 
Railway lines opened in 2004
2004 establishments in Ireland
Railway stations in the Republic of Ireland opened in the 21st century